There are no active volcanoes in the United Kingdom of Great Britain and Northern Ireland, although a few do exist in some British Overseas Territories, including Queen Mary's Peak in Tristan da Cunha, Soufrière Hills volcano on the Caribbean island of Montserrat, as well as Mount Belinda and Mount Michael in the British Overseas Territory of South Georgia and the South Sandwich Islands.

The last time that volcanoes were active in what is now the United Kingdom was the early Palaeogene period, just over 50 million years ago (Ma), associated with the opening of the Atlantic Ocean. Modern day hills and mountains within the UK which are sometimes described as extinct volcanoes are usually the deeply eroded roots of volcanoes active in prehistoric times. Some locations popularly believed to be volcanoes, such as The Wrekin, actually have different origins, such as being sites where volcanic material was deposited.

List
Below is a list of extinct volcanoes in the United Kingdom.

England

Northern Ireland

Scotland

Wales

See also 
 List of volcanoes in Montserrat
 List of volcanoes in South Sandwich Islands

References 

United Kingdom
Volcanoes
Volcanoes
United Kingdom geology-related lists